Joseph-Émile Brunet (1893–1977) was a Canadian sculptor based in Quebec. His output includes more than 200 monuments in bronze. Many of his sculptures depict national figures and events in Canada. He was born in Huntingdon, Quebec in 1893. He was educated at archbishop school, the Art Institute of Chicago, and the national superior École des Beaux-Arts of Paris.

Works
Joseph-Émile Brunet sculpted the bas reliefs and ornamental façade of the Gérard-Morisset building, Musée national des beaux-arts du Québec in Quebec City which depict historical scenes and events in Canadian History: "Fishing", "Fur Trading", "Maple Sugar Making", "Farming", "Logging", "Missionaries", "Landing Immigrates", "Buffalo Hunt"," Jacques Cartier"," Death of Wolfe"," Death of Montcalm","William Dollard", "Pierre Gaultier de Varennes, sieur de La Vérendrye" and "The First Settlers".

He was granted commissions for granite sculptures of key figures in the province of Quebec's history at the Parliament Building (Quebec):  "François de Laval", "Marguerite Bourgeoys", "Jean-Jacques Olier" and "Marie de l’Incarnation" completing the façade by 1965. He was also granted commission for two large bronze doors depicting animals native to Canada: "The Young Bear" and Cubs," "Canadian Moose", "Otters", "Elk with wolves", "Polar bear", "Beavers", American Bison", "Deer" and a "Great white Whale".

He sculpted a bronze War Memorial at Longueuil, Quebec (1924) in front of the city hall just across the river from Montreal.

He sculpted a statue of Pierre Gaultier de Varennes, sieur de La Vérendrye in Saint Boniface, Manitoba.

He sculpted the Canadian Pavilion for the Exposition Internationale des Arts et Techniques dans la Vie Moderne in Paris which included a  sculpture of a bison (1937) and panels on the outside of the structure. Paintings and a show inside the Canadian pavilion depicted aspects of Canadian culture. 
Mr. Joseph-Émile Brunet designed twenty-four capitals (1948) for the Basilica of Sainte-Anne-de-Beaupré, which depict 52 religious subjects reflecting the life of Jesus. Joseph-Émile Brunet sculpted 14 "Stations of the Cross" lining the walls of the cathedral. Stone statues of Saint Anne and Saints at the entrance of the cathedral.

He sculpted a bust of Adélard Godbout which was installed in Montreal, Quebec.

After his death in 1977, he was entombed at the Notre Dame des Neiges Cemetery in Montreal.

References

1893 births
1977 deaths
Modern sculptors
People from Montérégie
20th-century Canadian sculptors
Canadian male sculptors
20th-century Canadian male artists
School of the Art Institute of Chicago alumni
École des Beaux-Arts alumni
Burials at Notre Dame des Neiges Cemetery